Polanowice  is a village in the administrative district of Gmina Byczyna, within Kluczbork County, Opole Voivodeship, in south-western Poland.

The village has an approximate population of 500.

References

Polanowice